Chris Biotti (born April 22, 1967, in Waltham, Massachusetts) is a former professional ice hockey defenseman.  He was drafted in the first round, 17th overall, by the Calgary Flames in the 1985 NHL Entry Draft.

Career statistics

Regular season and playoffs

International

External links

1967 births
American men's ice hockey defensemen
Brunico SG players
Calgary Flames draft picks
Harvard Crimson men's ice hockey players
Ice hockey players from Massachusetts
Living people
National Hockey League first-round draft picks
Salt Lake Golden Eagles (IHL) players